This is a list of Members of Parliament (MPs) elected in the 1841 general election.

List

References

External links

See also 

 List of parliaments of the United Kingdom

1841 United Kingdom general election
1841
UK MPs 1841–1847
1841-related lists